The Centre Pawn Opening (or the MacLeod Attack) is a chess opening characterised by the moves:

1. e4 e5
2. c3

The opening was played 17 times in the New York 1889 tournament by 19th-century Canadian chess master Nicholas MacLeod but has otherwise arisen rarely in tournament play.

Discussion
White's second move prepares to push a pawn to d4, establishing a strong . Play can potentially transpose to other openings, most likely the Ponziani Opening or the Göring Gambit in the Scotch Game. Eric Schiller states, however, that the opening is too slow, that Black can respond vigorously with 2...d5 to eliminate transpositional possibilities and solve all his opening problems, as after 3.exd5 Qxd5, the move 4.Nc3 is not available to chase the queen away and gain a tempo.

After 2...d5, MacLeod played 3.Nf3 in MacLeod–Gossip, New York 1889, which continued 3...dxe4 (3...Nc6 is the Ponziani) 4.Nxe5 Qd5 (4...Bd6 5.Nc4 Be6 6.d4 exd3) 5.d4 exd3 6.Nd3 with an equal game after move 10 (Keres).

After 2...Nf6 3.d4, Rusakov–Verlinsky, USSR 1947, continued 3...Nc6 (3...Nxe4 was tried in Morphy–Bottin, Paris 1858) 4.Bg5 h6 5.Bh4 g5 6.Bg3 exd4 7.e5 dxc3, where 8.Nxc3! would have given White the upper hand with more  (Keres).

References 

Bibliography

Chess openings